Edwin Edogbo (born 21 December 2002) is an Irish rugby union player who is currently a member of Munster's academy as of the 2022–23 season. He plays as a lock and represents Cork club UCC in the amateur All-Ireland League.

Munster
Edogbo was selected for the Munster under-18s Clubs team in 2019 after helping east Cork club Cobh Pirates to the Munster under-18s final. Additionally, Edogbo also represented the Ireland under-18s Clubs and under-18s Schools sides. He began studying engineering at University College Cork in 2021 and featured for UCC in the early rounds of the 2021–22 All-Ireland League. Edogbo joined Munster's academy in November 2021, becoming the first player from Cobh Pirates to do so.

Despite being injured, Edogbo was registered with Munster's Champions Cup squad in December 2021 following the disruption caused by the province's tour to South Africa the previous month. After impressing during pre-season, Edogbo made his senior competitive debut for Munster in round two of the 2022–23 United Rugby Championship against Welsh side Dragons on 25 September 2022, coming on as a replacement for Fineen Wycherley in the 57th minute in the province's 23–17 away defeat, before making his first start for the province in their 31–17 home win against South African side the Bulls in round five of the URC on 15 October 2022.

Edogbo started in Munster's historic 28–14 win against a South Africa XV in Páirc Uí Chaoimh on 10 November 2022. He signed a three-year contract with Munster in January 2023, the first year of which will see Edogbo remain in Munster's academy for the 2023–24 season before joining the senior squad on a two-year contract from the 2024–25 season.

References

External links
Munster Academy Profile
URC Profile

2002 births
Living people
Black Irish sportspeople
Sportspeople from Cobh
Rugby union players from County Cork
Irish rugby union players
University College Cork RFC players
Munster Rugby players
Rugby union locks